The Football League was the second highest professional football league in Greece since its inception in 1962 as Beta Ethniki and until 2019. It then served as a third tier after the creation of the Super League 2 as the new second tier and it was eventually abolished in 2021 when the 2021–22 Super League 2 went from a 12 team to a 36 team league, absorbing most of the clubs from the Football League.

History

As the Second National Division (1962–2019) 
As the second tier of the Greek football league system, the Beta Ethniki was formally established in the fall of 1962, replacing the informal Greek FCA Winners' Championship, which at the time had tried various experimental formats towards establishing a second national football Division. All participating clubs had to disengage from their local football clubs associations' championships as a prerequisite for eligibility.

In its early years, the competition format was frequently altered each season. The competition was originally held in four groups of 14 clubs each until 1968–69, when the competition was reformatted to contain two groups. The following six years (1969–70 up to 1974–75), the competition was held with three Groups, whereas from 1975 to 1976 up to 1982–83 the league was again contested in two Groups, North and South. In the autumn of 1983, a single, pan-Hellenic League Table was established, a format that has been applied continuously until the 2012–13 season.
When football in Greece became professional, the Hellenic Football Federation handed over the responsibility for the competition's organization to the Greek Professional Football Clubs Association. In 2006, the Professional Football Association of the Second and Third National Divisions was set up, which replaced the Greek Professional Football Clubs Association as the governing authority of the Second and Third National Divisions.

In August 2010, the division's governing body decided to change its own, as well as the competition's distinctive title to Football League. The competition was contested as the Second National Division until 2019, when the Greek football league system was restructured and the Super League 2 was established as the new feeder league to the Super League.

As the Third National Division (2019–2021) 
As of 2019, the Football League Greece replaced the Gamma Ethniki as the third tier of the Greek football league system. It was finally abolished in 2021 with most clubs being absorbed into the second tier Super League 2.

Structure of the league
There were 20 clubs that competed in the Football League until 2021, playing each other in a home and away series. At the end of the season, the bottom four teams were relegated to the Gamma Ethniki. The top two teams gained automatic promotion. Unlike the Super League, clubs in the Football League did not get relegated if the club failed to obtain a license. All teams in the Football League took part in the Greek Cup.

Seasons in second division (1959-60 — present)
This is the complete list of the clubs that have taken part in the second division played from the 1959–60 season until the 2021–22 season of Super League 2. The teams in bold compete in Super League 2 in the 2022–23 season.

Results

Second Division champions

From 1962 to 1983

From 1983 to 2019

Third Division champions

From 2019 to 2021

See also
Football records and statistics in Greece
Greek football league system
Greek Cup

References

External links
Football League at Soccerway
Football League at footballleaguenews.gr

 
Football leagues in Greece
Greece
Greece
Defunct football competitions in Greece